Wrestling is one of the sports at the quadrennial Mediterranean Games competition. It has been a sport in the program of the Mediterranean Games since its inception in 1951.

Editions

All-time medal table
Updated after the 2022 Mediterranean Games

References
Mediterranean Games 1951 Results (PDF file)
Mediterranean Games 1955 Results (PDF file)
Mediterranean Games 1959 Results (PDF file)
Mediterranean Games 1963 Results (PDF file)
Mediterranean Games 1967 Results (PDF file)
Mediterranean Games 1971 Results (PDF file)
Mediterranean Games 1975 Results (PDF file)
Mediterranean Games 1979 Results (PDF file)
Mediterranean Games 1983 Results (PDF file)
Mediterranean Games 1987 Results (PDF file)
Mediterranean Games 1991 Results (PDF file)
Mediterranean Games 1993 Results (PDF file)
Mediterranean Games 1997 Results (PDF file)
Mediterranean Games 2001 Results (PDF file)
Mediterranean Games 2005 Results (PDF file)
Official website of the 2009 Mediterranean Games (archived)
Official website of the 2013 Mediterranean Games (archived)
Mediterranean Games 2022 Results (PDF file)

 
Wrestling
Mediterranean Games